"The Final Problem" is the third episode of the fourth series of the British television series Sherlock and the thirteenth episode overall. The episode was first broadcast on BBC One, PBS, Channel One and 1+1 on 15 January 2017.

Plot
A panic-stricken little girl wakes up on an aeroplane and finds everybody asleep. She picks a mobile phone up and hears Jim Moriarty announce, "Welcome to the final problem".

Mycroft Holmes is at home, where Sherlock and Watson trick him into revealing that their sister, Eurus, exists. At 221B Baker Street, Mycroft explains that Eurus was an era-defining genius on a par with Isaac Newton, with intellectual capacities far greater than Sherlock's and Mycroft's, coupled with a total lack of normal sensation and emotion. Mycroft reveals that their parents sent Eurus to a mental institution after she kidnapped and drowned Sherlock's dog Redbeard and after she burned their home down. Mycroft withheld this from Sherlock because Eurus had traumatized him as a child, taunting him with an enigmatic song, and leading ultimately to Mycroft having his memories "rewritten", he'd also been lying to their parents about Eurus not surviving the blaze she had set. An adult Mycroft then sent her to a Government "Black site" and maximum-security facility, a "Prison within a prison", in the North Sea, Sherrinford, unknown to anyone outside very high ranking government officials and only on a need to know basis. When Mycroft insists that she is secured, a quadcopter carrying a motion-activated grenade flies into Sherlock's flat. John, Sherlock, and Mycroft flee as the bomb detonates, blasting Holmes and Watson out of the windows.

Later, John and Sherlock hijack a fishing trawler to travel to Sherrinford, carrying out a diversionary plan so that Sherlock can reach Eurus' cell. Mycroft and John corner the prison governor, discovering that he has explicitly disobeyed Mycroft's protocol and has allowed Eurus to interact with prison staff. Using her skill to "reprogram" everyone she speaks with, Eurus has effectively ruled the prison. Meanwhile, Sherlock talks to Eurus, but she attacks him and knocks him unconscious. The guards lock Sherlock, John, Mycroft, and the governor together in Eurus's old cell.

Mycroft reveals that five years before, he granted Eurus an unsupervised five-minute interview with Moriarty as a Christmas present in exchange for detecting national security threats to Britain. During that time, Moriarty agreed to record video messages for her. After forcing the governor to commit suicide, Eurus mentally torments Sherlock, Mycroft, and Watson, forcing them into sinister games to save their lives while videos of Moriarty heckle them. Although Eurus forces Sherlock onward with the prospect of saving the girl on the aeroplane, he eventually stops the games by threatening to shoot himself when she orders him to murder either John or Mycroft. Furious, Eurus uses tranquilliser darts on the three of them.

Sherlock wakes up near the burnt-out wreckage of his family's old house. He speaks to the girl in the aeroplane to guide her in landing safely. John wakes up chained at the bottom of a well. As Eurus raises the water level in the well, John finds a human skull there. Sherlock realizes that what he thought was his dog Redbeard was his childhood friend, Victor Trevor. Eurus threw him into the well and left him for dead because she felt left out of Sherlock's attention as a child. Sherlock then deciphers the song's real meaning that Eurus originally taunted him with when Victor went missing, which reveals that she wants him to find her. Sherlock deduces that the girl in the plane is Eurus's mental metaphor and that the game has been a cry for help. With Eurus' puzzle solved, Sherlock sends her back to Sherrinford after rescuing John.

Mycroft explains to his and Sherlock's parents, who are angry that they had been told that Eurus was dead, that she refuses to speak to people anymore. Sherlock visits her, and they play the violin together, giving performances for their parents and Mycroft. While helping Sherlock repair his destroyed flat, John receives a video sent by Mary before she died, encouraging him to continue working with Sherlock.

Sources
The title of the episode is a reference to "The Final Problem" (1893). The riddle presented by Eurus in the form of a song is a reference to "The Adventure of the Musgrave Ritual" (1893), which it directly references. Watson's mention of the east wind and the name of Eurus Holmes are a reference to "His Last Bow" (1917), where Holmes says, "There's an east wind coming, Watson." The three Garrideb brothers seen in a puzzle sequence are an adaptation of "The Adventure of the Three Garridebs" (1924). The character Victor Trevor is a reference to "The Adventure of the Gloria Scott" (1893), where he appears as Holmes' first ever close friend, albeit in university rather than in childhood. Jim Moriarty's brother is mentioned as a broadcast station master, a reference to The Valley of Fear (1915), where James Moriarty's brother is noted to be a railway station master. The message on the coffin lid is a reference to "The Disappearance of Lady Frances Carfax" (1911). The closing shot shows Holmes and Watson exiting "Rathbone Place", a reference to Basil Rathbone, who played Sherlock Holmes in fourteen films and a radio series. 

In the final sequence, "The Adventure of the Dancing Men" (1903) is referenced with the following cipher seen on a chalkboard, which reads "AM HERE ABE SLANEY":

This idea (pictorial coded messages) was previously used as inspiration for the earlier series 1 episode The Blind Banker.

Production
The setting for Sherrinford, the high-security prison, was filmed at St Catherine's Fort, St Catherine's Island off Castle Beach in Tenby, Pembrokeshire, Wales.

Musician Paul Weller made a cameo appearance, in a non-speaking role as a man lying on the floor in a Viking costume, seen near the end of the episode.

Leak and investigation
On 14 January, one day before the episode's broadcast, it was released online with Russian dialogue. Both the official Sherlock Twitter account and members of the Sherlock team acknowledged this and asked people to not share it and keep the Internet free of spoilers.

On 16 January Channel One Russia, the network holding the rights to the broadcast in Russia, issued an apology, having determined that the material had been hacked from their system.  Channel One Russia announced it was conducting an investigation, while BBC, through BBC Worldwide, announced its own full-scale investigation of the leak.

Broadcast and reception
"The Final Problem" received mixed reviews from critics. Among the more positive reviews was Sean O'Grady of The Independent who gave the episode four out of five stars, stating that "Benedict Cumberbatch and Tim Freeman  are their usual accomplished double act" although suggesting "Maybe Sherlock needs a little more reimagining". Meanwhile, Michael Hogan of The Daily Telegraph gave the episode five out of five stars, praising that "the dazzling script delivered laughs, excitement, and emotion .. we were left with a wiser Holmes and Watson." He also commented about the possibility of series 4 being the last series for Sherlock, stating "if this was the last-ever episode, which it surely won't be, it worked well as a sign off." Louisa Mellor of Den of Geek wrote "this was fun to watch. Fun and ultra-tense with a terrific, whooshing sense of momentum. It went like the clappers, held its breath, went like the clappers again, held its breath some more until you thought you might pass out with the dizziness." Neela Debnath of the Daily Express was also positive, writing "I can't fault the thrill ride that The Final Problem takes viewers on from the beginning to the end. Sherlock has clawed itself back from the edge." Two separate reviews in The Observer or The Guardian were positive, with one describing it as too byzantine, but "much better than it looked" and the other writing "with a visual swagger far beyond the budget – and including an eerily beautiful high-security violin duet for Sherlock and Eurus – this was a fine way to go."

However, some reviews were more critical. A third Guardian review was negative, stating Holmes had "become a parody of himself". Kaite Welsh of IndieWire scored the episode a grade of B−, writing "Steven Moffatt and Mark Gatiss wrap up their 13th episode on an elegiac note, musing on the legend that is Sherlock and Watson. It's just a shame the rest of the episode was such a mess, really". Ian Hyland of The Daily Mirror stated that he preferred it "when Holmes and Watson were just solving fairly believable mysteries. If it went back to that I'd welcome another series or two with open arms." He compared the series to the BBC series Taboo, suggesting that the latter would be a better television series for those who love Sherlock. Aja Romano of Vox also criticized the episode, praising the usual drama of Sherlock, but being critical of the fact that the episode "collapses into a muddled mess of melodrama and confusion ... there is even less logic." Romano considered the episode to be an anticlimax, saying "the episode feels like a window dressing on a completely different story."

Issues of representation within the episode were raised by some commentators. Gavia Baker-Whitelaw of The Daily Dot called the episode the "most sexist" of the TV show. She noted that Eurus, a stereotypical female villain, "ticks every box for the kind of madwoman who gets locked up in an asylum in a 19th century melodrama" and commits crimes only motivated "by a desire for male attention."

References

External links
 

2017 British television episodes
Television episodes written by Steven Moffat
Television episodes written by Mark Gatiss
Sherlock (TV series) episodes
Fiction about mind control
Fiction about death games